My Boy is the third studio album of Richard Harris, released in 1971 by Dunhill Records. The album is about a love story between two people, which in time, develops from something platonic to a lost romance in their couplehood. They are only four Jimmy Webb songs on this album.

Origins of the album
In the year 1971, during a visit to Britain, Dunhill Records president, Jay Lasker, completed a record deal negotiations with Richard Harris. His first single release My Boy, which entered a music contest at Radio Luxembourg Grand Prix.

Reception
The album has mixed opinions, William York from AllMusic described it as "another difficult (and depressing) concept album". He further notes that this album is not for those seeking standard Harris fare, and those who want to introduce themselves to his art should start with A Tramp Shining or one of the "best-of" offerings. A review by Jean Ehmsen of the St. Louis Post-Dispatch focused on the strengths of Harris' voice, along with the romantic and paternal aspects of the album while ignoring any darker overtones.

Track listing
The album concept and synopsis by Richard Harris. Also, Richard Harris wrote the music of six songs.

Personnel
 Richard Harris – vocals
 Johnny Harris – producer, arranger
 Bill Martin and Phil Coulter – producer, side one track 3, 5 and side two track 5
 Dermont Harris - executive producer

Technical
 Barry McKinley – photography
 Peter Whorf – album design
 John Timperly - Chapell's Studios
 Martin Rushent - Advision Studios
 A Limbridge Productions

References 

Richard Harris albums
Dunhill Records albums
1971 albums
Albums produced by Bill Martin (musician)
Albums produced by Phil Coulter